Drumthwacket is the official residence of the governor of New Jersey. The mansion sits at 354 Stockton Street in Princeton, near the state capital of Trenton. It is one of only four official governor's residences in the country not located within their respective state capitals; the others are in Wisconsin, Ohio, and Tennessee. 

Built in 1835 and expanded in 1893 and 1900, Drumthwacket was sold with its surrounding land to the state in 1966. Drumthwacket was added to the National Register of Historic Places on June 10, 1975, for its significance in agriculture, architecture, commerce, landscape architecture, and politics. It was designated the governor's mansion in 1982.

The estate is administered by the New Jersey Department of Environmental Protection. In addition to being an executive residence, the house is also a historic house museum.

History
The Colonial era mansion of the governors of New Jersey, Proprietary House, is located in Perth Amboy.

The land that it is built upon was once owned by William Penn, the Quaker proprietor of the Province of Pennsylvania and founder of Philadelphia. William Olden acquired the property in 1696, and a small white homestead by Stockton Street called Olden House was later built on it.

In 1799 Charles Smith Olden was born there. Olden gained wealth working at a mercantile firm in Philadelphia and later New Orleans before returning to Princeton, where in 1835 he began to build Drumthwacket, taking its name from two Scottish Gaelic words meaning "wooded hill". Olden began his involvement in politics as a gentleman farmer and businessman, as treasurer and Trustee of the College of New Jersey (now Princeton University), as a state Senator, and finally in 1860 as governor, the first to live at Drumthwacket. The original structure consisted of a center hall with two rooms on each side, including the -story center section and large portico with six Ionic columns, which remains today.

In 1893, financier, industrialist, and Princeton University benefactor Moses Taylor Pyne purchased Drumthwacket for the sum of $15,000 from Olden's widow. Pyne was responsible for major expansions of the home, turning it into a magnificent estate, "surpassing anything previously built in Princeton". Pyne's huge wealth allowed him to add two wings on each side of the house, in 1893 and 1900, both designed by Raleigh C. Gildersleeve (who also designed many Princeton University buildings) and including a paneled library. Pyne also added park-like landscaping, greenhouses, bridle paths, a dairy farm, and formal Italian gardens.

Pyne died in 1921; the property, including the house and twelve surrounding acres, was sold by Pyne's one grandchild Agnes Pyne in 1941 to Abram Nathaniel Spanel. Spanel was an industrialist and inventor who had immigrated from Russia as a child. He founded the International Latex Corporation, which later became the International Playtex Corporation. Many of Spanel's engineers staff lived at Drumthwacket, and many of his patented inventions were conceived in what later became known as the Music Room.

In 1966, the Spanels sold the estate to New Jersey with the intent that it be used as the governor's official residence, to replace Morven, the old governor's mansion. However, it took 15 years for the estate to be used as an official residence, with the New Jersey Historical Society in 1981 finally raising enough funds. In 1982, the Drumthwacket Foundation was formed.

The conversion of the mansion into the state executive residence was spearheaded by then-New Jersey First Lady Deborah Kean, who also established the Drumthwacket Foundation, a non-profit organization responsible for preserving, restoring, and curating the house and its grounds.

Use by recent governors 
 Thomas Kean (1982–1990) lived in his private home in Livingston.
 James Florio (1990–1994) lived full-time in the mansion.
 Christine Todd Whitman (1994–2001) lived part-time in the mansion.
 Donald DiFrancesco (2001–2002) lived part-time in the mansion.
 John O. Bennett (2002) lived in the mansion for his 3½ days as Acting Governor.
 James McGreevey (2002–2004) lived full-time in the mansion. 
 Richard Codey (2004–2006) lived part-time in the mansion.
 Jon Corzine (2006–2010) lived part-time in the mansion. Drumthwacket became his full-time residence while he was recovering from injuries sustained in a severe automobile accident.
 Chris Christie (2010–2018) only used the mansion for Sunday dinners and official functions, while living in his private home in Mendham.
 Phil Murphy (2018-) lives in his private home in Middletown and uses the mansion for official functions and meetings.

Building details and tours
There are 12 private rooms upstairs used by the first family and six public rooms on the main floor that are the site of many official functions. An annual Garden Club holiday display is a tradition at the property.

Drumthwacket is open for guided tours on most Wednesdays, except for August, the day before Thanksgiving, and several other dates. The tour includes the six public rooms used by the governor for meetings and receptions, as well as the solarium, center hall, dining room, parlor, music room, library, and governor's study. Guided tours are conducted by volunteer docents. Visitors can walk through the gardens and visit the Olden House, the restored farmhouse on the property that houses a gift shop and the Drumthwacket Foundation.

See also
Governor’s Ocean Residence - Official ocean front NJ Governor's residence at Island Beach State Park, NJ

Notes

External links

Drumthwacket Foundation official website
 

Houses completed in 1835
New Jersey
Houses on the National Register of Historic Places in New Jersey
Historic house museums in New Jersey
Museums in Princeton, New Jersey
Government buildings in New Jersey
Houses in Princeton, New Jersey
National Register of Historic Places in Mercer County, New Jersey
New Jersey Register of Historic Places
Historic American Buildings Survey in New Jersey
Governor of New Jersey